Ovidio is a given name. Notable people with the name include:

Ovidio G. Assonitis (born 1943), independent film producer and businessman
Ovidio Cervi of the Cervi Brothers, the seven sons of Alcide Cervi and Genoveffa Cocconi
Gabriel Ovidio Curuchet (born 1963), retired road bicycle racer and track cyclist from Argentina
Ovidio García (born 1968), Spanish former alpine skier who competed in the 1992 and 1994 Winter Olympics
Dorian Ovidio Guachalla (born 1977), Bolivian male former volleyball player
Ovidio Guaita, journalist, photographer and traveller
Francisco Ovidio Vera Intriago (1941–2014), Roman Catholic bishop
Ovidio de Jesús (1933–2011), Puerto Rican sprinter
Ovidio Lagos (1825–1891), Argentine journalist, businessman and politician
Ovidio Lari (1919–2007), Italian prelate of the Catholic Church and the Bishop of Aosta
Ovídio Martins (1928–1999), famous Cape Verdean poet and journalist
Santo Ovídio, Portuguese saint
Ovídio Manuel Barbosa Pequeno (born 1954), São Toméan diplomat, who served as Minister of Foreign Affairs on two occasions
Ovidio Cortázar Ramos (born 1962), Mexican politician from the National Action Party

See also
Ovidio Lagos Avenue, a street in Rosario, Santa Fe Province, Argentina
Ophidia
Ovadia
Ovidia
Ovidie
Ovidiopol
Ovidiu
Oviedo

de:Ovidio
es:Ovidio (desambiguación)
it:Ovidio